This is a list of rural localities in Chuvashia. It is the homeland of the Chuvash people, a Turkic ethnic group. Its capital is the city of Cheboksary. As of the 2010 Census, its population was 1,251,619.

Alikovsky District 
Rural localities in Alikovsky District:

 Alikovo
 Bolshiye Toktashi
 Khirlepposi
 Siner
 Tautovo

Batyrevsky District 
Rural localities in Batyrevsky District:

 Batyrevo

Cheboksarsky District 
Rural localities in Cheboksarsky District:

 Abashevo

Ibresinsky District 
Rural localities in Ibresinsky District:

 Alshikhovo

Kanashsky District 
Rural localities in Kanashsky District:

 Sespel

Komsomolsky District 
Rural localities in Komsomolsky District:

 Komsomolskoye

Krasnoarmeysky District 
Rural localities in Krasnoarmeysky District:

 Krasnoarmeyskoye

Krasnochetaysky District 
Rural localities in Krasnochetaysky District:

 Krasnye Chetai

Morgaushsky District 
Rural localities in Morgaushsky District:

 Avdankasy
 Morgaushi

Poretsky District 
Rural localities in Poretsky District:

 Poretskoye

Shemurshinsky District 
Rural localities in Shemurshinsky District:

 Shemursha

Urmarsky District 
Rural localities in Urmarsky District:

 Arabosi

Vurnarsky District 
Rural localities in Vurnarsky District:

 Algazino
 Azim Sirma
 Azimsirminskoye
 Kalinino

Yalchiksky District 
Rural localities in Yalchiksky District:

 Yalchiki

Yantikovsky District 
Rural localities in Yantikovsky District:

 Yanshikhovo-Norvashi
 Yantikovo

See also 
 
 Lists of rural localities in Russia

References 

Chuvashia